Thomas Arthur Lyons  (March 27, 1869 – August 27, 1920) was a 19th-century major league baseball player.  He was a starting pitcher for the Syracuse Stars of the American Association in April and May 1890, starting three games.

External links

Major League Baseball pitchers
Baseball players from Massachusetts
Syracuse Stars (AA) players
1869 births
1920 deaths
19th-century baseball players
Salem Fairies players
Lowell Chippies players
San Francisco Friscos players
San Francisco Metropolitans players
Brockton Shoemakers players
Syracuse Stars (minor league baseball) players